Daimonion is the debut studio album by the Polish band Daimonion released on 15 June 2007 on Love Industry, an independent Polish record label. The album also serves as a re-issue of formerly self-released material circulating underground in the form of CD-R copies. It also marks the band's return to activity after they went on hiatus for several years.

Track listing 
 "Intro"
 "Wiatr" (Wind)
 "Poza Tobą" (Beyond You)
 "Inne kolory" (Altered Colours)
 "Tak blisko, a tak daleko" (So Close Yet So Far Away)
 "Torami Twojej produkcji" (Following Your Tracks)
 "Obłęd" (Madness)
 "Noc (jej siostra zabrała Twoje dni)" (Night)
 "Styks (długa podróż)" (Styx)

Personnel
 Marcin Tymanowski - vocal
 Marcin Gliszczyński - guitar
 Adrian Tymanowski - bass
 Daniel Kruz - drums

External links
 daimonion.republika.pl - official website

2007 debut albums
Daimonion (band) albums